Ugo Tomeazzi (born 24 December 1940) is an Italian footballer. A midfielder, he competed in the men's tournament at the 1960 Summer Olympics.

References

External links
 

1940 births
Living people
Footballers from Emilia-Romagna
Association football midfielders
Italian footballers
Olympic footballers of Italy
Footballers at the 1960 Summer Olympics
Serie A players
Serie B players
Modena F.C. players
Torino F.C. players
S.S.C. Napoli players
Mantova 1911 players
A.C. Monza players
Ravenna F.C. players